McNaron is a surname. Notable people with the surname include:

Diane McNaron (born 1947), American singer, producer, and Cabaret entertainer
Toni McNaron (born 1937), American literary scholar and lesbian memoirist